Moncey is a commune in the Doubs department in the Bourgogne-Franche-Comté region in eastern France.

History

Geography
It is surrounded by woods.

Population

See also
 Communes of the Doubs department

References

External links

 Moncey on the intercommunal Web site of the department 

Communes of Doubs